Mustafa Hilmi Pasha (1863–1922) was a general of the Ottoman Army.

He was the son of Ibrahim Pasha Sarim. In the early 20th century, he participated in the modernisation and unification of the Ottoman Army. 
 
In World War I, he commanded the VI Army Corps, which was sent to participate in the campaign against Romania during the period October 1916 – February 1918. 

In the Turkish War of Independence, he fought against French forces around Aleppo. He died in 1922 in Istanbul.

References

Sources

1863 births
1922 deaths
Military personnel from Istanbul
Ottoman Army generals
Pashas
Ottoman military personnel of World War I
Turkish military personnel of the Franco-Turkish War